Refuge de Presset is a refuge in the Alps.

History 
The shelter was built in 1966 and expanded in 1972. A new shelter was built in 2012-2013 and inaugurated in the summer of 2013.

Mountain huts in the Alps
Mountain huts in France